Zhao Xinchu (1915–1991), birth name Shuai Qitai or Shuai Yinghai, courtesy name Qitai, was a Chinese politician, born in Huangmei County, Hubei Province. He was the Communist Party of China Committee Secretary and Governor of Hubei.

1915 births
1991 deaths
People's Republic of China politicians from Hubei
Chinese Communist Party politicians from Hubei
Governors of Hubei
Political office-holders in Hubei
Delegates to the 5th National People's Congress
Members of the Central Advisory Commission
Politicians from Huanggang
People from Huangmei County